These are the members of the 15th Congress of the Philippines. The 15th Congress convened on July 26, 2010, and will adjourn around June 2013. Senators elected on the 2007 Senate election and senators elected on the 2010 Senate election comprise the Senate while representatives elected on the 2010 House of Representatives election comprise the House of Representatives.

Senate

*Senators are voted on a nationwide at-large basis.

1. Vacancy occurred on June 30, 2010 after the inauguration of Benigno S. Aquino III (Liberal) as President of the Philippines.
2. Assumed office on August 15, 2011 after winning an election protest against Migz Zubiri (Independent, formerly Lakas) who had earlier resigned on August 3, 2011.

House of Representatives

The term of office of the members of the House of Representatives will be from June 30, 2010, to June 30, 2013. The political party stated is the one that the member is currently a member of, which may be different from the one where the member ran under during the elections, or even from the one stated on the ballot.

Representatives elected from legislative districts

Sectoral representatives

Notes
 Switched to Liberal Party after the elections.
 Proclaimed, but his proclamation was nullified on July 23, 2010 because he was already disqualified for running for Congress by the COMELEC Second Division on May 8, 2011 since he was not a natural-born Filipino citizen. For the time being, he is still seated as a representative, as he is appealing to avoid being replaced by Reno Lim (Lakas-Kampi).
Died on December 25, 2012
 Died on July 22, 2010.
 Assumed office after winning a special election.
 The creation of the Dinagat Islands was declared unconstitutional by the Supreme Court on February 11, 2010, and the province was reverted to Surigao del Norte. However, the Supreme Court reversed its decision on April 13, 2011, and restored the Dinagat Islands as a province, along with its own representative.
 Ordered dropped from the rolls after the Supreme Court upheld the conviction of Ecleo for graft.
 Resigned due to a personal scandal.
 Assumed office after winning a special election.
 Died on January 26, 2012.
 Assumed office after winning a special election.
 Died on August 3, 2011.
Died on August 13, 2012.
 Replaced Homer Mercado on October 9, 2012 after his resignation.
 Replaced Solaiman Pangandaman on July 22, 2011 after his resignation.
 Died on April 24, 2013.

Changes
These are the changes in membership after the proclamation of winners:

Senate
A vacant seat can only be filled up on a special election held on the day of the next regular election.

House of Representatives
For representatives elected via legislative districts, a special election will be called to determine the successor unless the vacancy occurred a year before the next regular election.
For sectoral representatives, the next person on the list will take office.

Vacancies 
These are the vacant seats in Congress:
Senate (1):
The seat of Benigno Aquino III who gave it up after being elected president in 2010. It will remain vacant the term expires, as special elections for vacated Senate seats can only be scheduled on the next regular election.
House of Representatives (5):
The seat for 2nd district of Bohol after Erico B. Aumentado died. No special election was held.
The seat for 1st district of Cavite after Joseph Emilio Abaya was sworn in Secretary of Transportation and Communications. No special election was held.
The seat for lone district of Dinagat Islands after Ruben Ecleo was removed from the rolls. No special election was held.
The seat for 1st district of Sorsogon after Salvador Escudero died. No special election was held.
The seat for lone district of Camiguin after Pedro Romualdo died. No special election was held.
One seat of the Coalition of Associations of Senior Citizens in the Philippines, Inc. after David Kho resigned. The Commission on Elections forbade the party from calling up the 4th person from the list after the 3rd person from the list, who was ejected from the party, protested, and that Kho revealed it was a part of a term-sharing agreement, in which the commission has prohibited.

References

Members of the Congress of the Philippines